Folkloric Feel is Apostle of Hustle's debut album. It is indie rock with very subtle Latin influences, incorporating the sound stylings of the tres and permutations of Latin rhythms.

Track listing 

 "Folkloric Feel" – 7:49
 "Sleepwalking Ballad" – 5:22
 "Baby, You're in Luck" – 2:22
 "Energy of Death" – 3:35
 "Kings & Queens" – 5:07
 "Song for Lorca" – 3:55
 "Animal Fat" – 4:44
 "Dark Is What I Want / Strutters' Ball" – 4:06
 "Gleaning" – 4:31
 "They Shoot Horses, Don't They" – 5:53
 "Wedding Song"† – 0:38

† "Wedding Song" is an untitled bonus track not included in all CD pressings. It can be found in an Arts & Crafts compilation album titled Adventures in Advertising. Another non-album track is "The Wristwatch of the Shepherdess", an interpretative cover of the Cuban traditional "El Reloj de Pastora" by Arsenio Rodríguez. The two songs are also available in vinyl and digital download editions.

References

External links
 Folkloric Feel spotlight page on Arts & Crafts
 An informative interview by Ross Simonini (July 2005)

2004 albums
Apostle of Hustle albums
Arts & Crafts Productions albums